Seeds of Change is an organic seed and food company owned by Mars, Inc. Until summer 2010, the company was based in Santa Fe, New Mexico, and producers of a line of processed organic foods including pasta sauces and salad dressings. Seeds of Change was founded in 1989, as a seed company specializing in organics by Gabriel Howearth and Kenny Ausubel. The company devotes 1% of its net sales toward sustainable organic farming initiatives.

Research farm
The Seeds of Change Research Farm and Gardens were founded in 1989 in Gila, New Mexico by Gabriel Howearth.  By 1996, the Research Farm moved north to a site closer to the company's Santa Fe offices. The farm included over a thousand varieties of plants on six acres of land originally cultivated by the Tewa people on a flood plain along the Rio Grande in El Guique, New Mexico. The farm was certified organic by Oregon Tilth.

In August 2010, Mars announced that it would close the farm and move some management to Los Angeles. A final tour of the farm was provided on Saturday,  14 August, 2010. A spokesperson for Mars indicated the closure was due to a "strategic shift" and that not all the employees would retain their jobs.

1% Fund
In a partnership with Conservation International, Seeds of Change seeks to strengthen and protect traditional shade cropping cabruca cacao cultivation in Brazil. The 1% Fund also supports the Environmental Working Group, the Organic Trade Association, the Organic Center, and the Organic Farming Research Foundation.

References

External links

 Seeds of Change - France

Food and drink companies established in 1989
Agriculture companies of the United States
Food manufacturers of the United States
Seed companies
Mars brands
Products introduced in 1989